In Hindu astrology, Varshaphala (annual horoscopes) or the Progressed Horoscopes are cast according to the Tajika System propounded by Kesava and Neelakantha, which enables the astrologer to forecast events of immediate importance. The Lagna or ascendant of an annual horoscope is cast for the moment the Sun, after making a full round of twelve rasis or zodiacal signs, returns to the same position it occupied at the time of one’s birth. Muntha, which is an imaginary mathematical point, has an important role in this method of prognostication.

Muntha is the progressed ascendant that travels one Rasi or Sign per year beginning from the birth-ascendant at birth. It is found by adding the number (number denoting the particular sign) of the ascendant at the time of birth to the number of the years elapsed between birth and the year for which Progressed Annual Horoscope is cast, dividing the sum by 12 and rejecting the quotient. It is connected with the birth-chart. In a continuous cycle after 12 years it would come to occupy the same sign as the ascendant.

Muntha, whose degree would be the same as the birth-ascendant, gives very good results by occupying the 9th, the 10th or the 11th house counted from the annual-ascendant, favourable results by occupying the 1st, the 2nd, the 3rd or the 5th but only bad results when it is in the 4th, the 6th, the 7th, the 8th or the 12th house. Muntha aspected or joined by malefic planets, particularly Ketu, produces bad results. The Muntha-lord, the lord of the sign occupied by Muntha, occupying the 4th, the 6th, the 7th, the 8th or the 12th gives bad results.

Malefic planets in an unfavourable aspect with Muntha give ill-health, if occupying an unfavourable house the ascribed bad results become intensified. But the good indications of the house occupied by Muntha when its dispositor is in Ithsala yoga become more pronounced. The results for Muntha variously occupying the 12 houses and/or aspected or joined by anyone of the nine planets are described by the standard astrological texts dealing Tajika system. However, its connection with Rahu is exceptional. If Muntha is in the face of Rahu, there will be access to wealth, fame etc.; but if it is in the hind part of Rahu, there will be fear from enemies and difficulties all-round; if the same Rahu is in the lagna, then there will be financial troubles and loss of wealth. Muntha associating with either Jupiter or Venus or both confers promotion and inflow of wealth. Death or a very critical period in life is indicated if the Muntha-lord is associated with or aspected by the afflicted lord of the 8th or if the sign rising in the birth-ascendant falls on the 8th house devoid of benefic influences but if the Muntha-lord, unafflicted, occupies the sign held by Muntha auspicious results happen both at the beginning and at the close of the year concerned.

References

Technical factors of Hindu astrology